Crossocerus cetratus  is a Palearctic species of wasp.

References

External links
Images representing Crossocerus cetratus

Hymenoptera of Europe
Crabronidae
Insects described in 1837